Childa is a rural locality (a selo) in Khidibsky Selsoviet, Tlyaratinsky District, Republic of Dagestan, Russia. The population was 115 as of 2010.

Geography 
Childa is located 9 km north of Tlyarata (the district's administrative centre) by road. Anada is the nearest rural locality.

References 

Rural localities in Tlyaratinsky District